Ti hoeh koe ( or ), as known as pig's blood cake, is a blood pudding served on a stick as street food in Taiwan. Its alternative name is black cake. It is made with steamed pork blood, sticky rice and then coated in peanut powder and coriander with dipping sauces. Pig's blood cake came from Fujian to Taiwan and then developed. It is eaten as a snack. It can also be cooked in a hot pot. It is served hot by street vendors who keep it warmed in a wooden box or metal steamer. A description from Seriouseats described it as cross between a rice cake and mochi.

See also
 Taiwanese cuisine
 Night markets in Taiwan

References

Taiwanese pork dishes
Blood sausages